Government of José María Aznar may refer to:

First government of José María Aznar (1996–2000)
Second government of José María Aznar (2000–2004)